AMHS is an acronym which may mean:

Schools
Academic Magnet High School
Albertus Magnus High School
Alexander Mackenzie High School
Alexandria Monroe High School
Amityville Memorial High School
Ansbach Middle High School
Arabia Mountain High School
Archbishop MacDonald High School
Archbishop McCarthy High School
Archbishop Mitty High School
Archbishop Molloy High School
Archbishop Murphy High School
Arlington Memorial High School
Auburn Mountainview High School
August Martin High School
Avon Middle High School, a high school in Norfolk County, Massachusetts

Other
Aeronautical Message Handling System or more precisely ATS Message Handling System (air traffic control)
Alaska Marine Highway System
Anatomically modern Homo sapiens
Automated Message Handling System
Automated Material Handling System; see FOUP